Anatis is a genus of ladybird beetles. It contains the following species:

Species
Anatis halonis
Anatis labiculata
Anatis lecontei
Anatis mali
Anatis ocellata (Linnaeus, 1758)
Anatis rathvoni

References

External links
 Anatis at BioLib

Coccinellidae genera
Taxa named by Étienne Mulsant